Terrimonas aquatica is a Gram-negative, rod-shaped, aerobic and non-motile bacterium from the genus of Terrimonas which has been isolated from a freshwater spring from Taiwan.

References

External links
Type strain of Terrimonas aquatica at BacDive -  the Bacterial Diversity Metadatabase

Chitinophagia
Bacteria described in 2010